Hugo Castejón Fernández-Trujillo is a Spanish pop singer, songwriter and TV showman.

Early life
Hugo Castejón was born in Oviedo, Spain October 5, 1978. He grew up in Madrid. He went to high school in Boston. He studied business in Italy and in Philadelphia. In college in Italy, he started a band, acting as lead singer and songwriter.

Career
In 2013, Hugo wrote with co-writer and producer, Carlos Peralta (Maffio) his first song “Dance La Noche”. The song was released in November 2013. It reached the #4 position on iTunes Spain and the top ten in some Latin American countries.
 
In June 2014, Hugo wrote his second single “You’ll Be Mine”. It reached #1 position on iTunes Spain and was #1 in radio stations of different countries in Latin America. The song's Spanish version, “Vas A Flipar” was presented in Univision's Despierta America with great success.

In May 2015, Hugo released his 3rd single “Fiesta Tonight” in Spanish, reaching #1 position on iTunes Spain. In 2016, "No Te Vayas a Enamorar" was released. In 2018, the singer released his single "Ayer La Vi". In Jan 2020 he released "Meneo" and performed prime time on Telecinco.

Hugo was named It Boy of the moment by Men's Health Spain and Hombre 10 by Diez Minutos magazine.

Discography
Dance La Noche - November 2013 
Dance La Noche, Hugo Castejón Ft. Maffio - November 2013
You'll Be Mine - June 2014
Vas a Flipar (Spanish version of You'll Be Mine) - June 2014
Fiesta Tonight
Fiesta Tonight Spanish
No Te Vayas a Enamorar - May 2016
Ayer La Vi - May 2018
Meneo - Jan 2020

References

External links
Facebook
Instagram
Twitter
Hugo Castejón, el otro ‘protegido’ de Jaime García Legaz
Bio

Living people
Spanish singer-songwriters
21st-century Spanish singers
Year of birth missing (living people)